MSLP may refer to:
mean sea level pressure
Cuscatlan International Airport (for which it is the ICAO airport code)
the degree of Master of Speech-Language Pathology
the Mississippi branch of the Libertarian Party (United States)
MusclePharm
 Minority Student Leadership Program, a leadership development program of the American Speech-Language-Hearing Association
mSLP may refer to:
Mesh-enhanced Service Location Protocol